John Gascoigne may refer to:

John Gascoigne (lawyer) (fl. 1381), English lawyer and author
John Gascoigne (died 1568), Member of Parliament (MP) for Bedfordshire
John Gascoigne (died 1557), MP for Thirsk
John Gascoigne (died 1602), MP for Aldborough
Sir John Gascoigne, 1st Baronet (died 1637), of the Gascoigne baronets
Sir John Gascoigne, 5th Baronet (c. 1662–1723), of the Gascoigne baronets

See also
Gascoigne